Mummers' plays are folk plays performed by troupes of amateur actors, traditionally all male, known as mummers or guisers (also by local names such as rhymers, pace-eggers, soulers, tipteerers, wrenboys, and galoshins). Historically, mummers' plays consisted of informal groups of costumed community members that visited from house to house on various holidays. Today the term refers especially to a play in which a number of characters are called on stage, two of whom engage in a combat, the loser being revived by a doctor character. This play is sometimes found associated with a sword dance though both also exist in Britain independently.

Mumming spread from the British Isles to a number of former British colonies. It is sometimes performed in the street but more usually during visits to houses and pubs. It is generally performed seasonally or annually, often at Christmas, Easter or on Plough Monday, more rarely on Halloween or All Souls' Day, and often with a collection of money, in which the practice may be compared with other customs such as those of Halloween, Bonfire Night, wassailing, pace egging and first-footing at new year.

Although the term mummer has been in use since the Middle Ages, no scripts or  details survive from that era and the term may have been used loosely to describe performers of several different kinds. The earliest evidence of mummers' plays as they are known today is from the mid- to late 18th century. Mummers' plays should not be confused with the earlier mystery plays.

Etymology
The word mummer is sometimes explained to derive from Middle English mum ("silent") or Greek mommo ("mask"), but is more likely to be associated with Early New High German mummer ("disguised person", attested in Johann Fischart) and vermummen ("to wrap up, to disguise, to mask one's face"), which itself is derived from or came to be associated with mummen (first attested already in Middle High German by a prohibition in Mühlhausen, Thuringia, 1351) and mum(en)schanz, (Hans Sachs, Nuremberg, 16th century), these latter words originally referring to a game or throw (schanz) of dice. Ingrid Brainard argues that the English word "mummer" is ultimately derived from the Greek name Momus, a god of mockery and scoff.

Overview

Mummers' and guisers' plays were formerly performed throughout much of English-speaking Great Britain and Ireland, spreading to other English-speaking parts of the world including Newfoundland and Saint Kitts and Nevis. There are a few surviving traditional teams of mummers in England and Ireland, but there have been many revivals of mumming, often associated nowadays with morris and sword dance groups. These performances are comparable in some respects with others throughout Europe.

On 4 November 2017, following a similar announcement from the Lewes Bonfire Council, the Association of Mummers in England and Wales (AMEW) announced that Mummers would immediately cease the practice of "black-facing" or "blacking-up".

Broadly comic performances, the most common type features a doctor who has a magic potion able to resuscitate the vanquished character. Early scholars of folk drama, influenced by James Frazer's The Golden Bough, tended to view these plays as descendants of pre-Christian fertility ritual, but modern researchers have subjected this interpretation to criticism.

The characters may be introduced in a series of short speeches (usually in rhyming couplets) or they may introduce themselves in the course of the play's action. The principal characters, presented in a wide variety of manners, are a hero, most commonly Saint George, King George, or Prince George (but Robin Hood in the Cotswolds and Galoshin in Scotland), and his chief opponent (known as the Turkish Knight in southern England, but named Slasher elsewhere), and a quack Doctor who comes to restore the dead man to life. Other characters include: Old Father Christmas, who introduces some plays, the Fool and Beelzebub or Little Devil Doubt (who demands money from the audience).

In Ynysmeudwy near Swansea groups of four boys dressed as Crwmpyn (hunchback) John, Indian Dark, Robin Hood and Doctor Brown took the play from house to house on Bonfire Night and were rewarded with money.

Despite the frequent presence of Saint George, the Dragon rarely appears although it is often mentioned. A dragon seems to have appeared in the Revesby Ploughboys' Play in 1779, along with a "wild worm" (possibly mechanical), but it had no words. In the few instances where the dragon appears and speaks its words can be traced back to a Cornish script published by William Sandys in 1833.

Mumming groups often wear face-obscuring hats or other kinds of headgear and masks, some mummers' faces are blackened or painted. In 1418 a law was passed forbidding "mumming, plays, interludes or any other disguisings with any feigned beards, painted visors, deformed or coloured visages in any wise, upon pain of imprisonment". Many mummers and guisers, however, have no facial disguise at all.

Mumming was a way of raising money and the play was taken round the big houses. Most Southern English versions end with the entrance of "Little Johnny Jack his wife and family on his back". Johnny, traditionally played by the youngest mummer in the group, first asks for food and then more urgently for money. Johnny Jack's wife and family were either dolls in a model house or sometimes a picture.

History

Mummers and "guisers" (performers in disguise) can be traced back at least to 1296, when the festivities for the marriage of Edward I's daughter at Christmas included "mummers of the court" along with "fiddlers and minstrels". These "revels" and "guisings" may have been an early form of masque and the early use of the term "mumming" appears to refer specifically to a performance of dicing with the host for costly jewels, after which the mummers would join the guests for dancing, an event recorded in 1377 when 130 men on horseback went "mumming" to the Prince of Wales, later Richard II.

According to German and Austrian sources dating from the 16th century, during carnival persons wearing masks used to make house-to-house visits offering a mum(en)schanz, a game of dice. This custom was practised by commoners as well as nobility. On Shrove Tuesday of 1557 Albert V, Duke of Bavaria went to visit the archbishop of Salzburg and played a game of dice with him. A similar incident, involving an Englishman, is attested for the French court by the German count and chronicler Froben Christoph von Zimmern: during carnival 1540, while the French king Francis I was residing at Angers, an Englishman (ain Engellender) wearing a mask and accompanied by other masked persons paid a visit to the king and offered him a momschanz (a game of dice).

While mum(en)schanz was played not only by masked persons, and not only during carnival, the German word mummenschanz nevertheless took on the meaning "costume, masquerade" and, by the 18th century, had lost its association with gambling and dice. Other than this association there is no clear evidence linking these late medieval and early modern customs with English mumming.

Textual evidence

Although there are earlier hints (such as a fragmentary speech by St George from Exeter, Devon, which may date from 1737, although published in 1770), the earliest complete text of the "Doctor" play appears to be an undated chapbook of Alexander and the King of Egypt, published by John White (d. 1769) in Newcastle upon Tyne between 1746 and 1769. The fullest early version of a mummers' play text is probably the 1779 "Morrice Dancers'" play from Revesby, Lincolnshire. The full text ("A petygree of the Plouboys or modes dancers songs") is available online. Although performed at Christmas, this text is a forerunner of the East Midlands Plough Monday (see below) plays. A text from Islip, Oxfordshire, dates back to 1780.

A play text which had, until recently, been attributed to Mylor in Cornwall (much quoted in early studies of folk plays, such as The Mummers Play by R. J. E. Tiddy – published posthumously in 1923 – and The English Folk-Play (1933) by E. K. Chambers) has now been shown, by genealogical and other research, to have originated in Truro, Cornwall, around 1780. A play from an unknown locality in Cheshire, close to the border with Wales, dates from before 1788.

Chapbook versions of The Christmas Rhime or The Mummer's Own Book were published in Belfast, c.1803-1818. A mummers' play from Ballybrennan, County Wexford, Ireland, dating from around 1817–18, was published in 1863. It is from the 19th century that the bulk of recorded texts derive.

Mumming, at any rate in the South of England, had its heyday at the end of the 19th century and the earliest years of the 20th century. Most traditional mummers groups (known as "sides") stopped with the onset of the First World War, but not before they had come to the attention of folklorists. In the second half of the 20th century many groups were revived, mostly by folk music and dance enthusiasts.  The revived plays are frequently taken around inns and public houses around Christmas time and the begging done for some charity rather than for the mummers themselves.

Local seasonal variants

Although the main season for mumming throughout Britain was around Christmas, some parts of England had plays performed around All Souls' Day (known as Souling or soul-caking) or Easter (Pace-egging or Peace-egging). In north-eastern England the plays are traditionally associated with Sword dances or Rapper dances.

In some parts of Britain and Ireland the plays are traditionally performed on or near Plough Monday. These are therefore known as Plough plays and the performers as Plough-jags, Plough-jacks, Plough-bullocks, Plough-stots or Plough witches. The Plough plays of the East Midlands of England (principally Lincolnshire and Nottinghamshire) feature several different stock characters (including a Recruiting Sergeant, Tom Fool, Dame Jane and the "Lady bright and gay"). Tradition has it that ploughboys would take their plays from house to house and perform in exchange for money or gifts, some teams pulling a plough and threatened to plough up people's front gardens or path if they did not pay up. Examples of the play have been found in Denmark since the late 1940s.

England

Around Sheffield and in nearby parts of northern Derbyshire and Nottinghamshire a dramatised version of the well-known Derby Ram folksong, known as the Derby Tup (another word for ram), has been performed, since at least 1895, by teams of boys. The brief play is usually introduced by two characters, an old man and an old woman ("Me and our owd lass"). The Tup was usually represented by a boy, bent over forwards, covered with a sack, and carrying a broomstick with a rough, wooden sheep's head attached. The Tup was killed by a Butcher, and sometimes another boy held a basin to catch the "blood". There is a Sheffield version where the Tup is killed and then brought back to life by the Doctor. This is the main play performed by the Northstow Mummers based in Cambridge.

An Owd 'Oss play (Old Horse), another dramatised folksong in Yorkshire, was also known from roughly the same area, in the late 19th and early 20th centuries, around Christmas. The custom persisted until at least 1970, when it was performed in private houses and pubs in Dore on New Year's Day. A group of men accompanied a hobby horse (either a wooden head, with jaws operated by strings, or a real horse's skull, painted black and red, mounted on a wooden pole so that its snapping jaws could be operated by a man stooping under a cloth to represent the horse's body) and sang a version of The Old Horse or Poor Old Horse, which describes a decrepit horse that is close to death.

In Lincolnshire, similar traditions were known as 'plough plays', many of these were collected by the folklorist Ethel Rudkin.

Ireland
All known Irish play scripts are in English though Irish custom and tradition have permeated mumming ceremony with famous characters from Irish history – Colmcille, Brian Boru, Art MacMorrough, Owen Roe O'Neill, Sarsfield and Wolfe Tone. The mummers are similar but distinct from the other traditions such as wrenboys. The main characters are usually the Captain, Beelzebub, Saint Patrick, Prince George, Oliver Cromwell, The Doctor and Miss Funny.

The tradition of the mummers' play is still present in areas of Ireland including County Fermanagh, County Tyrone, County Wexford, and the Fingal area of County Dublin. The practice was discouraged by the Catholic Church in the early 20th century, but appears to have continued despite this condemnation. In 1935, the Carne Mummers were arrested for their street performance under the Dance Halls Act. In Fingal, the modern form of mummering was re-established by the Fingal Mummers in the 1980s, and is now documented as part of Ireland's National Inventory of Intangible Cultural Heritage. A festival is held each October in Fingal by a local school, Scoil Seamus Ennis, which has hosted mummering troupes from across Ireland and England.

Scotland
The Kirk Session records of Elgin name women who danced at New Year 1623 to the sound of a trumpet. Six men, described as guisers or "gwysseris" performed a sword dance wearing masks and visors covering their faces in the churchyard and in the courtyard of a house. They were fined 40 shillings each. In 1604 Tyberius Winchester was fined for "guising" through the town of Elgin with a pillowcase as a disguise and William Pattoun was accused of singing "hagmonayis". In January 1600, Alexander Smith's daughter was accused of guising in Elgin dressed as a man. This kind of dance and disguised "guising" through the town can be traced in various records. When Anne of Denmark came to Scotland in May 1590, twelve Edinburgh men performed a sword dance in costume with white shoes and floral hats, and other performed a Highland dance in costume. James VI himself wore a costume with a Venetian mask and danced at a wedding at Tullibardine in June 1591.

In 1831, Sir Walter Scott published a rhyme which had been used as a prelude to the Papa Stour Sword Dance, Shetland in around 1788. It features seven characters, Saint George, Saint James, Saint Dennis, Saint David, Saint Patrick, Saint Anthony and Saint Andrew, the Seven Champions of Christendom. All the characters are introduced in turn by the Master, St. George. There is no real interplay between the characters and no combat or cure, so it is more of a "calling-on song" than a play. Some of the characters dance solos as they are introduced, then all dance a longsword dance together, which climaxes with their swords being meshed together to form a "shield". They each dance with the shield upon their head, then it is laid on the floor and they withdraw their swords to finish the dance. St. George makes a short speech to end the performance.

Emily Lyle recorded the oral history of fourteen people from the lowlands of Scotland recounting their memories of seasonal folk dramas known as "Galoshins". Galoshin is the hero in a drama in the tradition of Robin Hood plays. Building on this research, Brian Hayward investigated the geographical distribution of the play in Scotland, and published Galoshins: the Scottish Folk Play, which includes several maps showing the locations where each version was performed. These are or were largely across the Central Belt of Scotland, with a strange and unexplained "outlier" at Ballater in Aberdeenshire. The Meadows Mummers are an all-female troupe who perform at local festivals inspired by both these writers, and by folk play workshops at the Scottish Storytelling Centre. In 2019 they performed at the Scots Music School in Barga, Italy.

Isle of Man
First recorded in 1832, the Manx White Boys play features a song and a sword dance at its conclusion. Although the key traditional characters include St. George, St. Patrick and others, modern versions frequently adapt the play to contemporary political concerns. Characters featured since the 1990s include Sir MHK, Sir Banker, Expert and Estate Agent. A a book on the White Boys compiled and edited by Stephen Miller was published in 2010; "Who wants to see the White Boys act?" The Mumming Play in the Isle of Man: A Compendium of Sources. It continues to be performed on the Saturday before Christmas each year.

Philadelphia
In Philadelphia every New Year's Day there is a Mummers' Day Parade that showcases pageantry and creativity. This grand parade has history in the old world, and performances in Philadelphia began in the year 1900. The parade traces back to mid-17th-century roots, blending elements from Swedish, Finnish, Irish, English, German, and other European heritages, as well as African heritage. The parade is related to the Mummers Play tradition from Britain and Ireland. Revivals of this tradition are still celebrated annually in South Gloucestershire, England on Boxing Day along with other locations in England and in parts of Ireland on St. Stephen's Day and also in the Canadian province of Newfoundland and Labrador around Christmas.

Other types of mummers

Feast entertainers
Mumming was used as a means of entertaining at feasts and functions, particular mention is made of one feast where 150 torch bearers lead the same number of mummers in, who would do acrobatics in a variety of costumes, including animal costumes.

Social mumming
At certain feast days (e.g. saint's days), a lot of the populace would put on masks, and in practices that vary with geography, celebrate the day.  One practice in example was for a group to visit a local manor, and 'sing out' the lord.  If the lord couldn't match verse for verse the singing group (alternating verses), then that lord would have to provide amenities.

The formation of roving mumming groups became a popular practice so common it became associated with criminal or lewd behaviour, as the use of masks allowed anonymity; in the time of Henry VIII, it was banned for a period.

Aristocratic mumming
On documents such as receipts and bills from the late medieval, come details of mumming parties organised by English monarchs, Henry VIII being known for taking his court mumming incognito. Later, Henry would ban social mumming, and bring the 'masque' form of entertainment to England.

Newfoundland mummers
"Mummering" is a Newfoundland custom that dates back to the time of the earliest settlers who came from England and Ireland. It shares common antecedents with the Mummers Play tradition, but in its current form is primarily a house-visiting tradition. Sometime during the Twelve Days of Christmas, usually on the night of the "Old Twelfth" (17 January; equivalent to 6 January in the old Julian calendar), people would disguise themselves with old articles of clothing and visit the homes of their friends and neighbours. They would at times cover their faces with a hood, scarf, mask or pillowcase to keep their identity hidden. In keeping with the theme of an inversion of rules, and of disguise, crossdressing was a common strategy, and men would sometimes dress as women and women as men. Travelling from house to house, some mummers would carry their own musical instruments to play, sing and dance in the houses they visited. The host and hostess of these 'mummers parties' would serve a small lunch which could consist of Christmas cake with a glass of syrup or blueberry or dogberry wine. Some mummers would drink a Christmas "grog" before they leave each house, a drink of an alcoholic beverage such as rum or whiskey. One important part of the custom was a guessing game to determine the identity of the visitors. As each mummer was identified, they would uncover their faces, but if their true identity is not guessed they did not have to unmask. The Mummers Festival takes place throughout December and includes workshops on how to make hobby horses and wren sticks.

Philadelphia mummers

Mummers plays were performed in Philadelphia in the 18th century as part of a wide variety of working-class street celebrations around Christmas. By the early 19th century, it coalesced with two other New Year customs, shooting firearms, and the Pennsylvania German custom of "belsnickling" (adults in masks questioning children about whether they had been good during the previous year). Through the 19th century, large groups of disguised (often in blackface) working class young men roamed the streets on New Year's Day, organizing "riotous" processions, firing weapons into the air, and  demanding free drinks in taverns, and generally challenging middle and upper-class notions of order and decorum. Unable to suppress the custom, by the 1880s the city government began to pursue a policy of co-option, requiring participants to join organized groups with designated leaders who had to apply for permits and were responsible for their groups actions. By 1900, these groups formed part of an organized, city-sanctioned parade with cash prizes for the best performances. About 15,000 mummers now perform in the parade each year. They are organized into four distinct types of troupes: Comics, Fancies, String Bands, and Fancy Brigades. All dress in elaborate costumes. There is a Mummers Museum dedicated to the history of Philadelphia Mummers.

Mummers in fiction
Thomas Hardy's novel The Return of the Native (1878) has a fictional depiction of a mummers' play on Edgon Heath. It was based on the author's childhood experiences.

Leo Tolstoy's novel War and Peace (1869) has a depiction of mummers, including Nikolai Rostov, Natasha Rostova, and Sonya Rostova, making house-to-house visits. They are depicted as a boisterous crowd dancing and laughing in outrageous costumes where men are dressed as women and women are dressed as men.

Ngaio Marsh's detective story Off with His Head (1957) is set around a particular version of the Guiser play / Sword Dance, the fictional "Dance of the Five Sons", performed on the "Sword Wednesday" of the Winter Solstice. The characters used in that dance are describes in great detail, in particular "The Fool", "The Hobbyhorse" and "The teaser" (called "Betty").

George RR Martin's A Song of Ice and Fire often features and references mummers, with characters regularly referring to a comical, bungled, unbelievable, or manufactured event as a "mummer's farce".

Music

There are several traditional songs associated with mumming plays; the "calling-on" songs of sword dance teams are related:
"The Singing of the Travels" by the Symondsbury Mummers, appears on SayDisc CD-SDL425 English Customs and Traditions (1997) along with an extract from the Antrobus, Cheshire, Soulcakers' Play
It also appears on the World Library of Folk and Primitive Music. Vol 1. England, Rounder 1741, CD (1998/reis), cut#16b
"The Singing of the Travels" was also recorded by the Silly Sisters (Maddy Prior and June Tabor).
"A Calling-on Song" by Steeleye Span from their first album Hark! The Village Wait is based on a sword-dance or pace-egg play calling-on song, in which the characters are introduced one by one
"The Mummers' Dance," a hit song from the album The Book of Secrets by Loreena McKennitt, refers to a springtime traditional mummers' play as performed in Ireland.
"England in Ribbons", a song by Hugh Lupton and Chris Wood is based on the characters of a traditional English mummers' play. It gave its name to a two-hour programme of traditional and traditionally-rooted English music, broadcast by BBC Radio 3 as the culmination of a whole day of English music, on St George's Day 2006
"The Mummer's Song", performed by the Canadian folk group Great Big Sea, but originally written by the Newfoundland folk band Simani, is an arrangement of the traditional song "The Mummer's Carol", which details the mummering tradition in Newfoundland and Labrador. A hip-hop version by M.W.A. (Mummers With Attitude) was released in 2014.
Mummer is the title of a 1983 album by the English rock band XTC.

See also

Adidam Mummery Sacred Theatre
Balliol rhyme
Căluşari Dancers of Romania
Careto
Clown
Commedia dell'arte
Courir de Mardi Gras
Jester
 Koledovanie
Kukeri Mummers of Bulgaria
Marshfield Mummers
Mystery play
Pantomime
Revels
St George's Day in England
Wassailing
Wrenboys

References

External links

Mummers' plays proper
 Mummers, Masks and Mischief — a 25-minute documentary featuring the Aughakillymaude Mummers of county Fermanagh in Ireland, produced and directed by James Kelly
 Folk Play Research Website — Scripts, photos, articles, databases, etc.
 Mystery History : The Origins of British Mummers' Plays — article by Peter Millington from American Morris Newsletter
Master Mummers' Directory of Folk Play Groups — details of over 250 groups
 South Riding Folk Arts Network: Christmas Luck-visiting customs
 The Truro cordwainers' play: a "new" eighteenth-century Christmas play — article by Peter Millington in Folklore,  April 2003
Comberbach Mummers Website; includes photos plus script for our version of St George and the Dragon
 The Weston Mummers website
 The Bradshaw Mummers website
 Mummers, Wrenboy and Strawboy traditions in Ireland
 Mumming — a Yuletide Tradition by Bridget Haggerty in Ireland
 Battery Radio Documentary about Christmas Mummering in Newfoundland
Plough Play
South West Dorset Mummers' Play 1880
Tewkesbury's Millennia of Mummers' Heritage kept alive - United Kingdom

Other related customs
 Mummering or Janneying in Newfoundland
 Momogeri — A Pontian Greek custom

Theatrical genres
Theatre in England
Folk plays
Mime
Winter traditions
Belarusian traditions
English traditions
Russian traditions
Slavic Christmas traditions
Christmas in Canada
Christmas in England